Nimrit Kaur Ahluwalia (born 11 December 1994), known professionally as Nimrit Ahluwalia, is an Indian actress who primarily works in Hindi television. Ahluwalia won Femina Miss Manipur (2018) and was among the top 12 of Femina Miss India 2018. She made her acting debut with Choti Sarrdaarni and is best known for her dual portrayal of Meher Kaur Dhillon and Seher Kaur Gill. Ahluwalia also participated in the reality show Bigg Boss 16.

Career
After starting her career in modeling and winning the Femina Miss Manipur title in 2018, she featured in B Praak's music video Masstaani and made her career propelled to entertainment industry.

Ahluwalia made her acting debut in the 2019 romantic television Choti Sarrdaarni proved to be a major breakout role in her career with her portrayal of Meher Dhillon and Seher Gill which gained her a household name until it ended in 2022. In 2021, she appeared in Bannet Dosanjh's music video titled Serious.

From 2022 to 2023, Ahluwalia participated in Colors TV's reality show Bigg Boss 16, she got evicted in the finale week and finished at 6th place.

Filmography

Television

Special appearances

Music videos

Awards and nominations 

Other honors
 Femina Miss Manipur (2018)

References

External links

Living people
Indian actresses
Indian female models
Indian lawyers
Indian theatre people
Ahluwalia
1994 births